Giller may refer to:

People
 Agaton Giller (1831-1887), patriotic Polish activist
 Doris Giller, Canadian literary critic
 Scotiabank Giller Prize, an annual Canadian English language literary award
 Edward B. Giller (1918-2017), United States Air Force general
 Stefan Giller (1833-1918), Polish Romantic poet
 Walter Giller (born 1927), German actor

Other uses
 Giller (fishing), a 19th-century term used in the Chesapeake Bay area for a gillnet fisherman
 Giller (mountain), a mountain in the Rhenish Massif, North Rhine-Westphalia and Hesse, Germany